is a private university in Takaoka, Toyama, Japan. The predecessor of the school was founded in 1959, and it was chartered as a university in 1989.

External links
 Official website 

Educational institutions established in 1959
Private universities and colleges in Japan
Universities and colleges in Toyama Prefecture
1959 establishments in Japan